Elias Sierra-Cappelleti (born 25 August 2001) is a Belgian professional footballer who plays as a midfielder for Eerste Divisie club Heracles Almelo.

Club career
Born in Hasselt, Sierra began his career with Belgian First Division A side Genk and made his professional debut for the club on 19 September 2020. He came on as an 81st-minute substitute for Eboue Kouassi as Genk were defeated 5–2.

International career
Born in Belgium, Sierra is of Spanish and Italian descent. He is a youth international for Belgium.

Career statistics

Club

References

External links

 Career stats & Profile - Voetbal International

2001 births
Living people
People from Hasselt
Belgian footballers
Belgium youth international footballers
Belgian people of Spanish descent
Belgian people of Italian descent
Association football midfielders
K.R.C. Genk players
Heracles Almelo players
Belgian Pro League players
Eredivisie players
Belgian expatriate footballers
Expatriate footballers in the Netherlands
Belgian expatriate sportspeople in the Netherlands